The Asian section of the 1962 FIFA World Cup qualification saw three teams enter and compete for a partial spot at the final tournament.

Format
The tournament consisted of one round with three teams played against each other on a home-and-away basis. The group winner advanced to the UEFA/AFC Intercontinental play-off.

Standings

Matches

Inter-confederation play-offs

Goalscorers

References

External links
 FIFA World Cup Official Site – 1962 World Cup Qualification
 RSSSF – 1962 World Cup Qualification

FIFA World Cup qualification (AFC)
AFC
1960 in Asian football
1961 in Asian football